Edward Kwasi Martin, better known as Eddie Martin or Kwasi Jones Martin, is an English musician, songwriter and producer.
Martin is the founding member of several production teams and recording groups. He has written and produced for a number of artists, and has his own publishing label called Monastery Music Group.

Producing and writing
Earlier in his career Martin's talents caught the attention of record producer Mykaell Riley. Martin worked as a programmer and researcher for Riley while studying a degree in commercial music, at the University of Westminster. During this time he worked with such as Mark Morrison, Peter Andre, Maria Rowe, MN8 and China Black. It was around this period that he produced demos for Livingston Brown, Gary Benson, Glen Goldsmith and Dionne Bernard (Infinity) – who was signed to RCA Records.

Groups and production teams
His work led him to collaborate in a number of groups and production teams. His first was a gospel act called 5 in 1, which was formed with his long term friend Muyiwa and produced in partnership with Qura Rankin.

In 2002, was the formation of Klinik Music Production. Martin along with Kenny Yeomans and Patrick Jacobs collaborated to bring a number of nu soul artists to the forefront of the music industry in Europe. This resulted in Klinik Music Production winning an EMMA Award for producing Tasha's World self entitled debut album.

In the same year, Martin teamed up for a second time with Muyiwa to form the gospel act Riversongz. He co-wrote and produced three albums over a period of six years including Restoration, Declaring His Power and Declaring His Love. It was with Declaring His Love in 2008 that Riversongz achieved a number one slot in HMV's album chart, becoming the fastest selling gospel album to be sold by this music store. To date the albums Declaring His Power and Declaring His Love have sold in excess of 80,000 combined units.

He formed the production teams Ashanti Boyz, Afroganic and Monk & Prof in 2007, with Kwame aka "Tha Prof". This collaboration has seen him produce a number of remixes for Jennifer Lopez's  "Hold It" and the Duran Duran single "Falling Down".

Martin has worked with a number of chart topping acts such as Eternal, Sarah Connor, Tasha's World, Bootsy Collins, Prince Mydas, Simon Webbe and Il Divo.

Discography

Written, produced or featured
Eternal – If She Breaks Your Heart –   EMI
Sarah Connor – Magic Ride – SonyBMG
Sarah Connor – Imagining – SonyBMG
Sarah Connor – I Can't Lie – SonyBMG
Tasha's World – Tasha's World (Album) – Dome Records
Tasha's World – World Domination (Album) – Dome Records
Bianca – Warner Records – UK
Mark D'Angelo – Crazy – UK
Martina Balogova – Pop Idol Winner – SonyBMG
Alex Cartana – Alex Cartana (Album) – EMI
Prince Mydas – Prince Mydas (Album) – MOBA
Riversongz – Restoration (Album) – UK
Riversongz – Declaring His Power (Album) – UK
Riversongz – Declaring His Love (Album) – UK
Amaree – I'll Get By – Chet Records
Amaree – Looser in love – Chet Records
Lee-Cabrera – Shake It (Move A Little Closer) – Credence
Simon Webbe – Star – Innocent Records
Ill Divo – Ancora – Syco Music/SonyBMG
Dycce – Concord Records – UK
Soulscyde – Inclusive (Album) – UK
Dionne – Dear Diary – Kandi Ent – USA
Best in Black Music – Dance Cinderfella –  Germany
Terry Walker – Drawing (Remix) – Def Jam

Tours and television
Vanessa Mea – Played second keyboards – UK & Europe Tour
Omar – keyboards – Flava, Channel 4

Remix
Chris Brown – "Wall to Wall" Ashanti Boyz Remix
Chris Brown – "With You" Ashanti Boyz Remix
Chris Brown – "Forever" Ashanti Boyz Remix
Jennifer Lopez – "Hold it" Ashanti Boyz Remix
Jennifer Lopez – "Do it Well" Ashanti Boyz Remix
Duran Duran – "Falling Down" Ashanti Boyz Remix
Westlife    – "Home" Ashanti Boyz Remix
Westlife – "Already there" Ashanti Boyz Remix
Celine Dion – "Eyes on You" Ashanti Boyz Remix
Kat Deluna – "Run the Show" Ashanti Boyz Remix
Shayne Ward – "Breathless" Ashanti Boyz Remix
The Script – "We Cry" Ashanti Boyz Remix
The Hoosiers – "Cops and Robbers" Ashanti Boyz Remix
Backstreet Boys – "Inconsolable" Ashanti Boyz Remix
Fantasia – "When I see you" Afroganic Remix – Arista
Jennifer Hudson – "Spotlight" Afroganic Remix – Arista
John Legend – "Green Light" Afroganic Remix – SonyBMG
John Legend – " Every Body Knows" Afroganic Remix – SonyBMG
Usher – "Trading Places" Monk & Prof Remix – LaFace, Arista
Jordin Sparks – "Tattoo" Monk & Prof (Afroganic) Remix – Jive Records
Suga Rush Beat – "Love" Afroganic KJ Remix – RCA
Sean Kingston – "Take you there" – AfroganicJK Remix – Epic
Ciara feat. T-Pain – "Go Girl" – AfroganicJK Remix – Zomba
Madcon- "Beggin" – AfroganicJK Remix – RCA
Annie Lennox – "Sing" AfroganicKJ Remix – SonyBMG
Natasha – "Hey Hey Hey" AfroganicKJ Remix – Jive
The Script – "We Cry" AfroganicKJ Remix – SonyBMG
Eamon – "Bring Him Home" AfroganicKJ Remix – Jive
Fried – "I'll Be There" AfroganicKJ Remix – SonyBMG
Prince Mydas – "Real Hardcore" AfroganicKJ Mix – Moba
Madcon Liar -(Monk & Prof Remix) RCA 2008
Lemar -Weight of the World-Monk & Prof
Jazmine Sullivan -"Dream – Monk & Prof
Zarif -"Let Me Back" RCA

Film and television compositions
Back Home Again – film soundtrack
Addictions of Sin: WH Auden in His Own Words – BBC

References

External links
Spread The Word magazine October/November 2003
RWD magazine
The Gospel magazine March 2008
Riversongz.com
Discogs.com
Ashantiboyz.com
Discogs.com
BBC.co.uk
Discogs.com
Sarah-conor.com
UKgospel.com
BBC.co.uk
Jazmine-sullivan-world.blogspot.com

Living people
English people of Ghanaian descent
English songwriters
21st-century Black British male singers
English record producers
Year of birth missing (living people)
British male songwriters